William Vincent Fuller V (born April 16, 1994) is an American football wide receiver who is a free agent. He was drafted by the Houston Texans in the first round of the 2016 NFL Draft. He played college football at Notre Dame.

High school career
One of five siblings (he has four sisters), Fuller attended Roman Catholic High School in Philadelphia, Pennsylvania, where he played high school football for the Cahillites. As a senior in 2012, he was named the MVP of the Philadelphia Catholic League 4A.

Considered a four-star recruit by Rivals.com, he was rated as the 19th best wide receiver prospect of his class. He originally committed to play college football at Penn State on June 3, 2012, after receiving a scholarship offer while on a visit at the school. However, Fuller would go on to switch his commitment to Notre Dame on August 5, 2012.

College career
Fuller played sparingly as a freshman at Notre Dame, catching only six passes. He scored his first touchdown on a 47-yard pass from Tommy Rees against Air Force on October 26, 2013. He recorded 160 receiving yards in that game, averaging 26.6 yards per catch, which led the team.

Fuller emerged as a starter his sophomore year following an impressive off-season, following that up by having a breakout season for the Irish. He recorded 76 receptions for 1,094 yards with 15 touchdowns, tying Golden Tate for the school single season record. His 15 touchdowns were tied for 3rd in FBS, behind Colorado State's Rashard Higgins and Alabama's Amari Cooper. In a game against Northwestern, he caught nine passes for 159 yards and three touchdowns, all career highs. He was recognized as an honorable mention All-American by Sports Illustrated following the season.

Fuller started off his junior season with two touchdowns on seven receptions for 142 yards against Texas. The following week against the Virginia Cavaliers, Fuller caught five passes for 124 yards and two touchdowns, including the game-winning touchdown pass with 12 seconds left from DeShone Kizer. He had six receptions for 131 yards and a touchdown against Georgia Tech in Notre Dame's third game of the season, a 30–22 victory. Against USC, he recorded 3 receptions for 131 yards, including a 75-yard touchdown to beat USC, 41–31. At Pitt, Fuller caught seven passes for 152 yards and three touchdowns leading to 42–30 victory. His three touchdowns allowed him to surpass both Golden Tate and Jeff Samardzija on the career touchdown list with 28, leaving him only second behind Michael Floyd's 37. Fuller caught six passes for 113 yards, including an 81-yard touchdown, in a losing effort against Ohio State in the Fiesta Bowl. Fuller finished the season with 62 catches and a career-high 1,258 yards with 14 touchdowns. He was named a second-team All-American by the Associated Press.

On January 3, 2016, Fuller announced he would forgo his senior year and enter the 2016 NFL Draft. He finished his Notre Dame career with 144 receptions for 2,512 yards (17.4 avg) and 30 touchdowns.

Collegiate statistics

Professional career
At the 2016 NFL Scouting Combine, Fuller ran the 40-yard dash in an official time of 4.32 seconds, which was the best time among wide receivers.

Houston Texans
Fuller was drafted by the Houston Texans in the first round with the 21st overall pick in the 2016 NFL Draft. He was the second wide receiver taken in the 2016 NFL Draft, only behind Baylor's Corey Coleman, who went to the Cleveland Browns with the 15th overall pick.

2016 season
In his first NFL game against the Chicago Bears on September 11, 2016, Fuller had five receptions (on 11 targets from quarterback Brock Osweiler) for 107 yards and a touchdown as the Texans won by a score of 23–14. In the next game against the Kansas City Chiefs, he had 104 receiving yards on four receptions, including a juggled catch for 53 yards. The Texans won by a score of 19–12. Two weeks later, Fuller returned a punt 67 yards for a touchdown against the Tennessee Titans. In doing so, he became the first player in franchise history to record a punt return touchdown and a receiving touchdown in the same game (as he had a touchdown reception earlier in the game). The Texans won 27–20.

On January 7, 2017, Fuller made his postseason debut against the Oakland Raiders in the Wild Card Round. He had four receptions for 37 yards in a 27–14 victory. His postseason would end the following week in the Divisional Round against the eventual Super Bowl LI Champion New England Patriots. In the 34–16 road loss, Fuller had three receptions for 16 yards.

In his rookie season, Fuller had 47 receptions for 635 yards, 196 return yards, two receiving touchdowns, and a return touchdown in 14 games and 13 starts.

2017 season
On August 2, 2017, during training camp, Fuller suffered a broken collarbone and was expected to be out 2–3 months. On September 27, 2017, Fuller was upgraded to full participation in the Texans' practice.

He made his season debut for the Texans in a 57–14 win against the Tennessee Titans in Week 4, catching four passes for 35 yards and two touchdowns along with a four-yard rush. In the next game against the Kansas City Chiefs, Fuller caught two passes for 57 yards and a touchdown and rushed for five yards in the 43–24 loss. The following week, he caught two passes for 62 yards and a touchdown as the Texans defeated the Cleveland Browns by a score of 33–17. After a Week 7 bye, the Texans went on the road to face the Seattle Seahawks. In that game, Fuller caught five passes for 125 yards and two touchdowns as the Texans lost 41–38.

Fuller finished the 2017 season with 28 receptions for 423 yards, 135 return yards, and seven receiving touchdowns in 10 games (all starts).

2018 season
Fuller missed the season opener at the New England Patriots with a hamstring injury, which the Texans lost 27–20. He made his season debut in Week 2 against the Tennessee Titans as the second receiver on the Texans' depth chart. He had eight receptions for 113 yards and a touchdown in the 20–17 road loss. In the following game, a 27–22 loss to the New York Giants, Fuller had another solid outing with five receptions for 101 receiving yards and a touchdown. During Week 4, he notched his third consecutive game with a touchdown in a 37–34 overtime victory over the Indianapolis Colts. During a Week 8 42–23 home victory against the Miami Dolphins, Fuller tore his ACL, prematurely ending his season. In seven games and starts, he finished the season with 32 receptions for 503 yards and four touchdowns. Without Fuller, the Texans finished atop the AFC South with an 11–5 record and lost to the Colts in the Wild Card Round by a score of 21–7.

2019 season
On April 26, 2019, the Texans picked up the fifth-year option on Fuller's contract.

Fuller returned from his injury in time for the Texans' season opener on the road against the New Orleans Saints. He recorded two receptions for 69 yards in the 30–28 loss. During a 53–32 victory against the Atlanta Falcons in Week 5, Fuller finished with 217 receiving yards, marking the first time in his NFL career with 200+ yards in a game. During Week 12 against the Indianapolis Colts, he racked up 140 yards on seven receptions in the 20–17 victory.

Fuller finished the 2019 season with 49 receptions for 670 yards and three touchdowns in 11 games and starts. The Texans finished atop the AFC South with a 10–6 record and were the #4 seed in the playoffs. In the Divisional Round against the Kansas City Chiefs, Fuller caught five passes for 89 yards as the Texans lost on the road by a score of 51–31 despite having a 24–0 lead in the second quarter.

2020 season
In the offseason, Fuller's teammate DeAndre Hopkins was traded to the Arizona Cardinals, making Fuller the Texans' number-one wide receiver. In Week 1 against the Kansas City Chiefs, Fuller recorded eight receptions for 112 yards in the 34–20 loss. In Week 4 against the Minnesota Vikings, Fuller caught six passes for 108 yards and a touchdown during the 31–23 loss. Late in the fourth quarter on a fourth down play, Fuller appeared to catch a touchdown pass to potentially tie the game that was reversed upon further review. In Week 6, against the Tennessee Titans, he had six receptions for 123 receiving yards and a touchdown in the 42–36 overtime loss. In Week 9 against the Jacksonville Jaguars, Fuller caught 5 passes for 100 yards, including a 77 yard touchdown, during the 27–25 win. In Week 12 against the Detroit Lions, Fuller caught six passes for 171 yards and two touchdowns in a 41–25 victory. On November 30, Fuller was suspended six games for violating the league's policy on performance-enhancing drugs. He missed the last five games of the 2020 season and missed the first game of the 2021 NFL season. In 11 games, Fuller finished the season with 53 catches for 879 yards and eight touchdowns, which were all career highs.

Miami Dolphins
On March 20, 2021, Fuller signed a one-year contract with the Miami Dolphins. He suffered a broken thumb in Week 4 and was placed on injured reserve on October 6, 2021.

NFL career statistics

References

External links
 
 Twitter
 Notre Dame Fighting Irish bio

Living people
1994 births
Players of American football from Philadelphia
American football wide receivers
Notre Dame Fighting Irish football players
Houston Texans players
Miami Dolphins players